Rhombodera papuana is a species of praying mantises in the family Mantidae. It is found on the island of New Guinea.

See also
List of mantis genera and species
Mantodea of Asia
Mantodea of Oceania

References

P
Insects of Papua New Guinea
Endemic fauna of Papua New Guinea
Mantodea of Asia
Mantodea of Oceania
Insects described in 1929